Chrysoritis wykehami is a species of butterfly in the family Lycaenidae. It is endemic to South Africa. It is often considered a subspecies of Chrysoritis turneri.

Sources
 

Chrysoritis
Butterflies described in 1980
Endemic butterflies of South Africa
Taxonomy articles created by Polbot
Taxobox binomials not recognized by IUCN